The IAR-111 Excelsior is a supersonic mothership project, designed by ARCA Space Corporation, intended to transport a rocket payload up to  and for developing space tourism related technologies. The aircraft is to be constructed almost entirely from composite materials, and will be designed for take-off and landing from the sea surface.

History
The design of the aircraft started before the successful launch of the Helen 2 rocket. ARCA kept work on the project secret and decided to reveal it to the public in a press conference that took place at BRD headquarters in Bucharest in December 2010. The initial name of the aircraft was E-111. In March 2011 ARCA received approval from IAR S.A. Brasov to use its initials on the aircraft, so E-111 was officially renamed IAR-111.

Work on the fuselage moulds started in early 2011 and were completed in September. The cockpit structure was completed in July. It is detachable from the rest of the aircraft and will be equipped with two rocket propelled parachutes (main and back-up) as a safety system. Also in September the CFD simulations for the aircraft were completed. On 29 September 2011, a successful cockpit drop-test was carried out. In December 2011, the first two sections of the aircraft fuselage were completed and preliminary assembled.

Design

Features
The IAR-111 is designed to take-off and land on the sea surface. ARCA decided to use this approach to eliminate the need for a landing gear and thus reduce the cost of the aircraft. Another factor that went into the decision was the fact that Romania has no unpopulated areas above which to safely test the aircraft to high altitude flights.

The aircraft has diamond-shaped wings to reduce weight, and lower drag at high speeds; "V" tails were chosen to avoid contact with the water on take-off and landing. It has two floats and the payload is located between them, acting as a third float. The payload will be either the Haas 2 rocket or an external fuel tank.

For aerodynamic surface control it will use a hydraulic system controlled by fly-by-wire from the cockpit. The aircraft will be powered by the new Executor liquid-fuelled rocket engine, under construction at ARCA, which will use kerosene as fuel and liquid oxygen as oxidizer.

Safety
The cockpit walls and windows are very thick, able to withstand an engine explosion. Additionally, the cockpit is detachable and is equipped with two rocket propelled parachutes (main and back-up). The aircraft will have a very large recovery parachute and a smaller anti-stall parachute.

One of the parachutes was opened to test the explosive bolts. The test was a success and the cabin was recovered in good condition.

Specifications
The specifications released to date are approximate design goals, and include:

See also
Northrop YF-23, similar wing and tail shape
Boeing NB-52 & North American X-15
Pegasus (rocket)
Shuttle Carrier Aircraft
SpaceShipOne

References

Private spaceflight
Experimental aircraft
Rocket-powered aircraft
ARCAspace